Bryan Rennie (born 21 December 1984, in South Africa) is a rugby union player for Bristol in the RFU Championship. His position of choice is as a centre.

Brian played for the Border Reivers before joining London Irish, he has made himself eligible for the Scotland National Team. For the 2010 season, Bryan is playing as a centre for the Aviva Premiership side, the Exeter Chiefs. In 2012, it was announced that he would be joining Bristol.

References

External links
London Irish profile
Exeter Chiefs profile

1984 births
Living people
London Irish players
Exeter Chiefs players
Hong Kong Scottish RFC players
South African rugby union players
Rugby union centres
South African expatriate rugby union players
South African people of Scottish descent
South African expatriate sportspeople in Scotland
South African expatriate sportspeople in Hong Kong
South African expatriate sportspeople in England
Scotland 'A' international rugby union players
Border Reivers players
Bristol Bears players
Watsonians RFC players
Rugby union players from Durban
Expatriate rugby union players in England
Expatriate rugby union players in Scotland
Expatriate rugby union players in Hong Kong